Physeomorpha vianai is a species of beetle in the family Carabidae, the only species in the genus Physeomorpha.

Average size: 16 mm

Distribution: Argentina

Habitat: in the refuse piles of the leaf cutter ant, Atta sexdens.

References

Paussinae